Eddie Soto (born June 14, 1972) is a former American soccer player who played as a  forward. Soto spent five seasons in the USISL and has served as an assistant men’s and women’s collegiate soccer coach for eight seasons.

Youth
Soto played for the North Huntington Beach youth club, winning the 1991 James McGuire Trophy as the U.S. U-19 national champion.  He was also a member of the U-18 and U-20 national teams.  In addition to his national team and club commitments, Soto attended Cerritos High School where he was a two time Parade Magazine high school All-American and the 1990 California 3A Player of the Year.  Soto graduated from Cerritos in 1991 and entered Chapman University that fall.  He played one season at Chapman before transferring to Cal State Fullerton where he played from 1992 to 1994.  He scored thirty-eight goals in his three seasons, earning second team All-American recognition in 1992.  His thirty-eight goals places him second on the school’s career goals list.  He graduated in 1995 with a bachelor’s degree in kinesiology.

Professional
In 1994, Soto spent the collegiate off-season playing for the Montclair Standard Falcons of the USISL.  In the spring of 1995, Soto signed with the Anaheim Splash of the Continental Indoor Soccer League, but the team released him before he entered a game. In June 1995, Soto signed with the Los Angeles Salsa U-23 in the USISL.  In February 1996, the MetroStars of Major League Soccer selected Soto in the eighth round (79th overall) of the Inaugural Player Draft.  The team waived him on March 26, 1996.  Soto returned to Southern California where he played for U.S. Beach Soccer and worked as a machinist.  In 1997, he signed with the Orange County Zodiac of the USL A-League.  In March 1998, the San Jose Clash selected Soto in the second round (23d overall) in the 1998 MLS Supplemental Draft.  Once again, the team released him in the preseason.  In 2000, the Zodiac was renamed the Wave.  Soto left the Wave at the end of 2000 season and spent some time with the USA Pro Beach Soccer Team before retiring from playing.

Coaching
In addition to playing, Soto also coached at the collegiate and youth soccer levels.  In 1997, he was the assistant coach with the Long Beach City College women’s soccer team when they won the California State Championship.  In 2001, he was hired as an assistant coach at Cal State Fullerton.  In 2004, he moved to Long Beach State as an assistant.  On July 12, 2006, UCLA hired Soto as an assistant coach, but he also spent that season with Cal State Fullerton.  On April 15, 2009, Soto also became the head coach of the United States national beach soccer team  In 2012, the Los Angeles Galaxy hired Soto to coach its U-18 Academy team.  In January 2013, Soto became the head of the U-15 team.

References

External links
 UCLA Bruins coaching profile
 Article providing Soto’s early career information

1972 births
Living people
American soccer coaches
American soccer players
Cal State Fullerton Titans men's soccer players
Montclair Standard Falcons players
Los Angeles Salsa U-23 players
Orange County Blue Star players
UCLA Bruins men's soccer coaches
USISL players
A-League (1995–2004) players
Chapman University alumni
Los Angeles Salsa players
San Jose Earthquakes draft picks
LA Galaxy non-playing staff
San Francisco Dons men's soccer coaches
Association football forwards
American beach soccer players
Soccer players from California
People from Artesia, California
Chapman Panthers
Long Beach City Vikings coaches
Cal State Fullerton Titans men's soccer coaches
Cal State Dominguez Hills Toros men's soccer coaches
College women's soccer coaches in the United States
Long Beach State Beach coaches
Sportspeople from Los Angeles County, California